Américo Henriques (1923—2006) was a Portuguese prelate of the Catholic Church. He served as the second and final Bishop of the Diocese of Nova Lisboa, before its promotion and renaming as the Archdiocese of Huambo.

Biography 
Born on 6 October 1923 in Portugal, Américo Henriques was ordained a priest on 19 July 1947 in the Diocese of Lamego.

On 3 July 1966, he was elevated to the prelature as an auxiliary bishop of Lamego. He was consecrated to the episcopacy by Archbishop Maximilien de Furstenberg, who was later elevated to cardinal. He held that position for less than a year before becoming Coadjutor Bishop of the diocese. On 3 February 1966, Henriques was appointed Bishop of the Diocese of Lamego following the retirement of Bishop João da Silva Campos Neves, who had served for more than 20 years. On that same date, he was appointed Titular Bishop of the Titular See of Tisili, and was ordained to the position on 11 October 1966.

He served in that position for a little more than a year, before being appointed Bishop of the Diocese of Nova Lisboa in what is now Angola on 2 February 1971. He was the second and last bishop of that diocese, as it was promoted and renamed the Archdiocese of Huambo following his retirement on 13 April 1976.

He died on 14 August 2006 at the age of 82.

References 

1923 births
2006 deaths
Portuguese Roman Catholic bishops in Africa
Bishops of Lamego
20th-century Roman Catholic bishops in Angola
Roman Catholic bishops of Huambo
Portuguese expatriates in Angola